Rudy Williams may refer to:

Rudy Williams (saxophonist) (1919-1954), American jazz saxophonist
Rudy Williams (footballer) (born 1965), Honduran footballer